Knüpfer is a surname. Notable people with the name include:

Johann Knüpfer (1866–1910), schizophrenic outsider artist
Kerstin Knüpfer (born 1963), German handball player
Nikolaus Knüpfer (1609–1655), Dutch Golden Age painter
Sebastian Knüpfer (1633–1676), German composer, conductor and educator

See also
Edy Knupfer (1912 –1979), Swiss architect